Ptilophora horieaurea is a moth of the family Notodontidae. It is known from Sichuan in China.

External links
The genus Ptilophora (Lepidoptera, Notodontidae) in China, with description of a new species

Notodontidae